Ischasia is a genus of beetles in the family Cerambycidae, containing the following species:

 Ischasia cuneiformis Fisher, 1952
 Ischasia ecclinusae Penaherrera-Leiva & Tavakilian, 2004
 Ischasia exigua Fisher, 1947
 Ischasia feuilleti Penaherrera-Leiva & Tavakilian, 2003
 Ischasia indica Giesbert, 1991
 Ischasia linsleyi Giesbert, 1996
 Ischasia mareki Penaherrera-Leiva & Tavakilian, 2004
 Ischasia nevermanni Fisher, 1947
 Ischasia nigripes Zajciw, 1973
 Ischasia picticornis Zajciw, 1973
 Ischasia pouteriae Penaherrera-Leiva & Tavakilian, 2004
 Ischasia rufina Thomson, 1864
 Ischasia sabatieri Penaherrera-Leiva & Tavakilian, 2004
 Ischasia valida Gounelle, 1911
 Ischasia viridithorax Penaherrera-Leiva & Tavakilian, 2004

References

Rhinotragini